Bar 20 is a 1943 American Western film directed by Lesley Selander and written by Morton Grant, Michael Wilson and Norman Houston. The film stars William Boyd, Andy Clyde, George Reeves, Dustine Farnum, Victor Jory, Douglas Fowley, Betty Blythe, Robert Mitchum and Francis McDonald. The film was released on October 1, 1943, by United Artists.

Plot

Hopalong Cassidy and his sidekicks California Carlson and Lin Bradley leave their Bar 20 ranch for a cattle buy from the Stevens spread. Along the way, they encounter Mrs. Stevens, her daughter Marie and ranch hand Mark Jackson, whose stagecoach has been robbed by the Quirt Rankin gang.

Marie's stolen jewels are held for ransom and her sweetheart Richard Adams intends to raise the money. Jackson, secretly the boss of Quirt's gang, tries to swindle Richard out of his land and lends him cash that was Hoppy's cattle money before the robbery. He also kills Quirt.

Hoppy mistakenly believes Richard to be the thief and takes back the money. The honest Richard forms a posse that places Hoppy, California and Lin under arrest. A scheme to trap Jackson pays off, however, and once he's apprehended, all is well.

Cast 
William Boyd as Hopalong Cassidy
Andy Clyde as California Carlson
George Reeves as Lin Bradley
Dustine Farnum as Marie Stevens
Victor Jory as Mark Jackson
Douglas Fowley as Henchman Slash
Betty Blythe as Mrs. Stevens
Robert Mitchum as Richard Adams 
Francis McDonald as Quirt Rankin
Earle Hodgins as Tom

References

External links 
 

1943 films
Hopalong Cassidy films
American black-and-white films
1940s English-language films
Films directed by Lesley Selander
United Artists films
American Western (genre) films
1943 Western (genre) films
Films with screenplays by Michael Wilson (writer)
1940s American films